Kongo University is a university in the Democratic Republic of the Congo.  Its name is abbreviated to UK, after its French name.  The main offices of the university are located in Mbanza-Ngungu.  UK currently operates two linked campuses, at Mbanza-Ngungu and at Kisantu.  A permanent third campus at Mbanza-Luvaka has been under construction since 1992.

Faculties and programs

Mbanza-Ngungu Campus
 Faculty of Business and Economics
 Faculty of Engineering
 Faculty of Law

Kisantu Campus
 Faculty of Agriculture
 Faculty of Medicine
 Faculty of Literature and Mass Communication

External links
Kongo University official site - available in French
Kongo University - available in English, French, Kikongo and Portuguese

Universities in the Democratic Republic of the Congo
Kisantu

1990 establishments in Zaire
Educational institutions established in 1990